This list of University of Miami alumni includes globally-recognized academics, business executives, scientists, heads of state and governmental agencies, political and nonprofit leaders, television and film personalities, musicians, professional athletes, artists, authors, writers, and others. For a list of the University of Miami's most notable faculty, see list of University of Miami faculty.

The university is a private research university that offers 138 undergraduate, 140 master's, and 67 doctoral degree programs across 12 schools and colleges with nearly 350 majors and programs.

The University of Miami is a major research university with $375 million of annual research and sponsored program expenditures, making it the 71st largest university for research in the nation. Its undergraduate academic admissions standards are the highest of any university or college in the state of Florida, and the university is Carnegie-classified as: "Doctoral Universities: Very High Research Activity." University of Miami faculty include globally-recognized leaders in most academic disciplines, including four Nobel Prize winners to date.

With 16,479 faculty and staff, the University of Miami is the second largest employer in Miami-Dade County, the most populous county in Florida and seventh most populous county in the nation. The University of Miami has been regularly ranked one of the top universities in the U.S. by U.S. News & World Report, which ranks it the 55th best national university as of 2021. It has an endowment of $1.4 billion as of 2021.

The university's athletic teams are collectively known as the Miami Hurricanes and compete in Division I of the National Collegiate Athletic Association. Its football team has won five national championships since 1983 and its baseball team has won four national championships since 1982.

Academics

Art and literature

Business

Film

Law

Music

Politics

Sciences

Sports

Current Hurricanes athletes

Golf

International basketball

Current players

Major League Baseball

Current players

Former players

Mixed martial arts

National Basketball Association

National Football League

Current players

Former players

Sailing

Soccer

Sports administration

Swimming and diving

Tennis

Current players

Former players

Track and field

Women's National Basketball Association

Television

References

External links

University of Miami
University of Miami alumni